Cork's RedFM is an Irish radio station which broadcasts to Cork and the surrounding area, and is aimed at a youth audience. The station commenced broadcasting on 16 January 2002" and was awarded Ireland's first youth radio licence. Its target market is the 15-35 age group in Cork city and county.

History 

Some of RedFM's key personnel had previously worked with "Longwave, Atlantic 252" which ceased broadcasting on Thursday 20 December 2001. RedFM's first Chief Executive, Cork native Henry Condon and former presenter Charlie Wolf, a Boston native, were both well known voices on Atlantic 252. Adrian Bodenham was Red FM's Production Director at launch, and moved to Ireland to join the team from the UK's Virgin Radio. The station has picked up 13 PPI Radio Awards since first broadcasting, including winning the "Best Breakfast Show" award two years in a row, in 2008 and 2009. In 2014 the station signed up a well known Cork Presenter Neil Prendeville. Neil had previously been a staple of rival local station Cork's 96FM. Listenership to RedFM has improved since the transfer.

In December 2017, a sale was agreed of the 17.5% of Red FM owned by Landmark Media Investments to The Irish Times pending regulatory approval. In July 2018, the 17.5% stake in the station to The Irish Times was complete.

Business 

Siteridge Limited currently hold a licence from the Broadcasting Authority of Ireland for Cork City and County and broadcast as Red FM. Shareholders in Siteridge Limited included Thomas Crosbie Holdings. Thomas Crosbie Holdings went into receivership in March 2013. Their stake acquired by Landmark Media Investments.

In March 2013, Dublin born Diarmuid O'Leary, the then Advertising Sales Director of the Irish Daily Star, joined RedFM as CEO.

News 

RedFM's Head of News is female, and all Newsreaders female, with the exception of some male sports readers who occasionally read News.

Frequencies

References

External links
Red FM
Market comment on Red FM launch in 2002

Contemporary hit radio stations in Ireland
Mass media in County Cork